Jovan Pajković (born 28 February 1946) is a Serbian boxer. He competed in the men's featherweight event at the 1968 Summer Olympics.

References

1946 births
Living people
People from Ub, Serbia
Yugoslav male boxers
Serbian male boxers
Olympic boxers of Yugoslavia
Boxers at the 1968 Summer Olympics
Featherweight boxers